The Grassengrat is a multi-summited mountain of the Urner Alps, located on the border between the cantons of Obwalden and Uri in Central Switzerland. It lies on the range between the Titlis and the Gross Spannort. The main summit has an elevation of 2,941 metres and is named Stössenstock.

References

External links
 Grassengrat on Hikr

Mountains of the Alps
Mountains of Switzerland
Mountains of the canton of Uri
Mountains of Obwalden
Obwalden–Uri border